Rosina Schneeberger (born 16 January 1994) is an Austrian alpine ski racer.

References

External links
 
 

1994 births
Living people
Austrian female alpine skiers
Place of birth missing (living people)